Agrostocrinum is a genus of herbs in the family Asphodelaceae, subfamily Hemerocallidoideae, first described by Ferdinand von Mueller as a genus in 1860. The entire genus is endemic to the State of Western Australia.

Species
 Agrostocrinum hirsutum (Lindl.) Keighery, Nuytsia 15: 250 (2004)
 Agrostocrinum scabrum (R.Br.) Baill., Bull. Mens. Soc. Linn. Paris 2: 1119 (1893)

References

External links

Asphodelaceae genera
Hemerocallidoideae
Endemic flora of Australia